David Cockerell is an electronics engineer and designer. He started his career in the synthesizer world when Peter Zinovieff hired him to work for his EMS company in Putney in 1966, where he designed classic EMS synthesizers such as the Synthi VCS3, Synthi AKS and Synthi 100. In 1974 he worked for Electro-Harmonix in New York, where he first designed guitar pedals like the Small Stone phaser and Electric Mistress flanger. Still working for Electro-Harmonix, in 1980, Cockerell designed one of the first digital delay pedals with looping capabilities, the Instant Replay, followed by the 2 Second Digital Delay in 1981 and the 16 Second Digital Delay in 1982. This led him later to work at Akai, where he was involved in the design of samplers like the S612, S900, S1000, and the famous MPC60.

He is currently working for Electro-Harmonix as a Chief Design Engineer.

Career

EMS 
Cockerell was working as a medical technician when a coworker of his, Mark Dowson, introduced him to Peter Zinovieff who was looking for someone with the technical skill to make the sounds Peter wanted to create.

The company's first commercial synthesizer, the VCS3, designed by David Cockerell, was produced in 1969, followed by the Synthi KB1 in 1970, also designed by Cockerell.

Electro-Harmonix 
In 1974 Cockerell went to visit some friends in New York, where he met Electro-Harmonix's founder Mike Matthews, who made Cockerell an offer to work for him as a Chief Design Engineer.

Products designed 
 Akai MPC60 (Electronic circuit design only)
 Akai S612
 Akai S900
 Akai S1000
 Electro-Harmonix 16 Second Digital Delay
 Electro-Harmonix 2880 Super Multi-Track Looper
 Electro-Harmonix Bass Balls - Twin Dynamic Filters for Bass Guitar
 Electro-Harmonix Bass Micro Synthesizer
 Electro-Harmonix Crying Tone
 Electro-Harmonix DRM16 Digital Rhythm Matrix model 01
 Electro-Harmonix Electric Mistress
 Electro-Harmonix HOG Guitar Synthesizer
 Electro-Harmonix Instant Replay
 Electro-Harmonix Micro Synthesizer
 Electro-Harmonix POG Polyphonic Octave Generator
 Electro-Harmonix Small Stone - Phase Shifter
 Electro-Harmonix Stereo Memory Man with Hazarai
 Electro-Harmonix Vocoder
 Electro-Harmonix XO Micro POG - Polyphonic Octave Generator
 Electro-Harmonix XO Stereo Electric Mistress
 EMS Synthi 100
 EMS Synthi A
 EMS Synthi AKS
 EMS Synthi Hi-Fli
 EMS Synthi KB1
 EMS VCS3
 EMS VCS4

References

Living people
Year of birth missing (living people)
American electronics engineers